James Hansen (February 17, 1884 – May 14, 1951) was a provincial politician from Alberta, Canada. He served as a member of the Legislative Assembly of Alberta from 1935 to 1940, sitting with the Social Credit caucus in government. He died of heart disease in 1951.

References

Alberta Social Credit Party MLAs
1951 deaths
1884 births
Danish emigrants to Canada
People from Taber, Alberta